The House at 31 Woodbine Street is a historical house situated at 31 Woodbine Street in Newton, Massachusetts.

Description and history 
Built c. 1845, this two-story Greek Revival house is one of the first to be built when the Auburndale area was subdivided for suburban development. The -story wood-frame house has a porch, supported by paneled square columns, that wraps around two sides. Its gable roof, while oriented with the roof line parallel to the street, has a fully pedimented gable end, as do the dormers that pierce the roof.

The house was listed on the US National Register of Historic Places on September 4, 1986.

See also
 National Register of Historic Places listings in Newton, Massachusetts

References

Houses on the National Register of Historic Places in Newton, Massachusetts
Houses completed in 1845
Greek Revival houses in Massachusetts